The Vice President of the Democratic People's Republic of Korea was a political position in North Korea established in 1972, and abolished after the death of Kim Il-sung during the reign of Kim Jong-il. 

In 1972 the Presidency was established, and Kim Il-sung was elected to the position by the Supreme People's Assembly, the North Korean legislature, on 28 December 1972. The Vice Presidents were also elected by the Assembly. The Vice Presidency has been left vacant since October 1997, when the Presidency was eternally reserved for Kim Il-sung.

List of vice presidents of North Korea

See also 

President of North Korea
Kim dynasty (North Korea)
Vice President of South Korea

References 

Government of North Korea
Vice presidents of North Korea
North Korea